Music for Nitrous Oxide is the first studio album released by Stars of the Lid on Sedimental Records in 1995. The album features minimal, droning compositions of varying length. The press release from Sedimental Records read: “Sedimental announces the first CD from Austin drone stars Stars of the Lid, an amazing 4-track recording that is created in the spirit of Eno, Main and Spacemen 3. Produced without keyboards, this lo-fi ambient journey employs predominately [sic] guitar, avoiding typical rock elements while still possessing the ‘home’ recorded feel of so much independent music.”

In 2009 Sedimental Records released a remastered version featuring updated artwork by Craig McCaffrey.

Adamord features an excerpt of a letter written by Alcoholics Anonymous co-founder Lois W., addressed to her husband.

Track four features an audio clip of Brent Spiner from the seventh season Star Trek: The Next Generation episode "Force of Nature". Spiner's character Data is shown attempting to train his cat Spot not to jump onto his keyboard while he is working.  Track four also contains a snippet of Chopin's Prelude Op.28, No.7.

Track five features a clip from the film Apocalypse Now during which Frederic Forrest's character Jay 'Chef' Hicks suffers a nervous breakdown aboard a boat after encountering a tiger in the Cambodian jungle.  This clip is interspersed with one of an unknown sci-fi program discussing extraterrestrials.

Track seven features an audio clip of C.H. Evans who played Jack in Hap's Diner, in David Lynch's film Twin Peaks: Fire Walk with Me. Evans' line is: "Now, her name is Irene and it is night. Don't take it any further than that. There's nothin' good about it."

Recording 
Most of the album was recorded on a Yamaha MT120 4-Track cassette recorder. However, track 9 was recorded on a Revox A77 2-track reel-to-reel recorder, and track 6 was recorded to DAT tape from their first live performance in Spring of 1994.

Track listing
“Before Top Dead Center” – 5:25
“Adamord” – 11:51
“Madison” – 9:24
“Down” – 6:34
“Lagging” – 3:58
“(Live) Lid” – 9:48
“Tape Hiss Makes Me Happy” – 13:05
“The Swell Song” – 9:24
“Goodnight” – 7:02

References

External links
 Dusted Review 2009
 Baltimore City Paper 2009 Review

1995 debut albums
Stars of the Lid albums
Instrumental albums